PS Merstone was a passenger vessel built for the Southern Railway in 1928.

History

The ship was built by Caledon Shipbuilding of Dundee and launched on 26 January 1928 by Mrs Donald A Mathieson, wife of the former general manager of the Scottish section of the L.M.S. Railway Company.  She was one of an order for two new ships, the other being .

She was withdrawn from service at Christmas 1950 and sold in September 1952 for breaking in Northam.

References

1928 ships
Steamships of the United Kingdom
Paddle steamers of the United Kingdom
Ships built in Dundee
Ships of the Southern Railway (UK)